Ailly-sur-Noye (literally Ailly on Noye) is a commune in the Somme department in Hauts-de-France in northern France.

Geography
Ailly-sur-Noye station has rail connections to Amiens and Creil.

Population

Places and monuments

Cultural and sports activities
 Annual Son et Lumière Le Souffle de la terre narrates the story of the people of Picardy from Gaulish times up to the Second World War. More than 450,000 have been to see the spectacle.
 Water sports on the lake area.
 Motocross club on two different courses.
 45 separate clubs and societies participate in the life of the community.

See also
Communes of the Somme department

References

External links

(All French language)
 The website of the son et lumière ‘Le souffle de la terre’
 Office de Tourisme du Val de Noye
 Ailly sur Noye official site

Communes of Somme (department)